A piscicide is a chemical substance which is poisonous to fish. The primary use for piscicides is to eliminate a dominant species of fish in a body of water, as the first step in attempting to populate the body of water with a different fish. They are also used to combat parasitic and invasive species of fish.

Examples of piscicides include rotenone, saponins, TFM, niclosamide and Antimycin A (Fintrol).

Plant-based piscicides

Historically, fishing techniques of  indigenous people around the world have frequently included the use of plant-based piscicides. Many of these plants are natural sources of rotenone and saponins. 

The genera Tephrosia, Wikstroemia, and Barringtonia are well known as fish poisons.

See also
Cyanide fishing
Environmental impact of pesticides#Aquatic life

References

Pesticides
Fisheries science